Röövel Ööbik is Estonian indie-rock group. Recorded a John Peel Session in 1993, in Maida Vale studios with the lineup Allan Hmelnitski (guitar), Tarvo Hanno Varres (bass, vibes), Tõnu Pedaru (vocals), Raul Saaremets (drums, guitar).

Discography

Studio albums 
 "Ilu" (Kuldnokk, 1989. MC)
 "Popsubterranea" (TWINCD 10, Finland, 1992, CD / Umblu Records, 2007. CD)
 "Psychikosmos" (KC Rec KC 01, 1996. MC,CD)
 "Supersymmetry" (Umblu Records, 2005. CD)
 "Ringrada" (Umblu Records, 2009. CD)

References

External links 
 John Peel on Röövel Ööbik, BBC Radio 1, 1990

Estonian indie rock groups